Hockanum can refer to some places in the United States:

Hockanum (East Hartford), a neighborhood in East Hartford, Connecticut
Hockanum River, a river of north central Connecticut
Hockanum Rural Historic District, a historic district in the town of Hadley, Massachusetts
Hockanum, an archaic name for the village of Higganum in the town of Haddam, Connecticut